Al Salibikhaet Sporting Club is a Kuwaiti professional football club based in Sulaibikhat City in the Al Asimah Governorate (Kuwait).

Achievements
Kuwaiti Division One: 3
1976/77, 2008/09, 2011/12

Sulaibikhat
Sulaibikhat
Sulaibikhat
Sulaibikhat
Sulaibikhat